Higashi-Kakogawa is the south-east region of Kakogawa City in Hyōgo Prefecture, Japan. It consists of Hiraoka-cho, Befu-cho, Noguchi-cho. Occasionally it includes Onoe-cho. Higashi-Kakogawa Station is located there.

Institutions

It has various institutions such as a welfare facility for the aged, Hyogo University, a Multiplex (movie theater), the Kakogawa Synthetic Cultural Centre (加古川総合文化センター).

Geography of Hyōgo Prefecture